Christian Poirier (born 6 December 1954) is a French former racing cyclist. He rode in the 1979 Tour de France, but did not finish.

Major results
1976
 2nd Overall Tour du Loir-et-Cher
1977
 3rd Paris–Bourges

References

External links
 

1954 births
Living people
French male cyclists
People from Château-Gontier
Sportspeople from Mayenne
Cyclists from Pays de la Loire